The Mulungushi Dam located 50 km south-east of Kabwe, Zambia was constructed by the Broken Hill Development Company on the Mulungushi River and opened in 1925 by the then Prince of Wales (the future Edward VIII) to provide hydroelectric power to the Broken Hill Mine in Kabwe (known as Broken Hill at that time). It is a sister facility to the Mita Hills Dam 60 km to its north-east. The Lunsemfwa Hydropower company currently controls the power stations of both dams and the one at Lunsemfwa Falls.

The man-made lake created by the Mulungushi Dam is approximately 20 km long and 2-3 km wide and is home to the Mulungushi Boat Club and a local fishing competition.

The dam was completed and the Mulungushi Power Station officially opened by the Prince of Wales officially in 1925.

The contractors involved with the construction of the dam used the Mulungushi Boat Club site originally. On completion of the dam, the site was handed over to the mine.  The MBC was started by a band of watersport enthusiasts in the late 1940’s and the first clubhouse was the present boat shed. The present clubhouse was built during the 1950’s with, we believe generous donations from the Rhodesia Broken Hill Development Co. Ltd.,(the owners of the Mine in Kabwe) and the Companies who were constructing the Luensemfwa power station and the owners of GI mines who were mining gypsum at Kampumba. The members of the MBC assisted in the construction by forming working parties on the weekends to install the plumbing, lighting and other ancillary works. During the 1950’s the club purchased the existing rondavels from Rhodesia Railways and these were erected by the members.

In the 1960’s and 1970’s the MBC was a popular weekend retreat for both mine employees and Broken Hill residents with regattas held every year. On long weekends there were always visitors and members from outside Broken Hill.

During the 1970’s and early 1980’s the club was a hive of activity with fishing competitions, national regattas, and even para sailing. There were sufficient Kabwe-based members who owned sailing boats to have sailing races most Saturday afternoons and Sunday mornings. It was during this time that the club first allowed members to build their own private chalets. Most of the existing private chalets were built in the late 1970’s and early 1980’s. It is now hard to believe that during the 1970’s the best attendance at the Zambia National Sailing Regatta which was held at Mulungushi was 140 plus sailing boats. Mulungushi was known for some of the best sailing conditions and facilities in the region.

During the years of UDI , the Zimbabwean freedom fighters had a training camp just past what is known as Crocodile Island, or “the gap” and therefore members were initially not allowed “through the gap”. The club was eventually taken over by the Zambian army and declared a restricted area and the club remained closed for many years. Even after the closure of the mine and the sale of the mine assets, the mining company initially included all the club grounds in the sale of the Dam and power station, but fortunately for the club members the purchasers were not able to come up with the payment and when it was re-advertised the mining company excluded the club grounds and the club put in a successful offer for the purchase of the club on behalf of the members. Thus, in 1996 the club was revived and as the grounds now belong to the club a lot of developments have taken place.

References
Zambia Lowdown website accessed 19 February 2007.

Buildings and structures in Central Province, Zambia
Dams in Zambia
Buildings and structures completed in 1925
1925 establishments in Northern Rhodesia